Ioannis Sioutis (alternate spelling: Giannis) (born July 27, 1973) is a Greek retired professional basketball player and current assistant coach for AEK Athens of the Greek Basket League and the Basketball Champions League, under head coach Ilias Kantzouris. He has also previously worked as an assistant for Panathinaikos. At a height of 1.84 m (6 ft ½ in), he played at the point guard position during his active basketball career.

Professional career
Sioutis started his playing career with the youth team of Milon in 1986. In 1995, he transferred to Aris. In 1997, he won the Korać Cup, and in 1998, he won the Greek Cup, both while playing with Aris. In 1999, he played with Panionios and in 2000, he returned to Aris. In 2002, he won the EuroLeague 2001–02 championship while playing with Panathinaikos.

He also played with Irakleio, Peristeri, Ilysiakos, Dafni, and ICBS. In 2007, Sioutis won the Greek 2nd Division with Sporting, and he then transferred to AEK Athens.

National team career
Sioutis also played in 11 games with the Greek national basketball team.

External links 
FIBA Profile
FIBA Europe Profile
Hellenic Federation Profile 
Eurobasket.com Profile

Greek men's basketball players
Greek Basket League players
1973 births
Living people
AEK B.C. players
Aris B.C. players
Dafnis B.C. players
ICBS B.C. players
Ilysiakos B.C. players
Irakleio B.C. players
Milon B.C. players
Panathinaikos B.C. players
Panionios B.C. players
Peristeri B.C. players
Sporting basketball players
Point guards
Basketball players from Athens